Favourite Worst Nightmare is the second studio album by English rock band Arctic Monkeys, released on 23 April 2007 by Domino Recording Company. Recorded in east London's Miloco Studios with producers James Ford and Mike Crossey, the album was preceded by the release of "Brianstorm" on 2 April 2007. This is the band's first album with bassist Nick O'Malley, replacing their previous bassist Andy Nicholson, who left the band before the North America tour of the band's debut studio album.

In comparison to the band's debut album Whatever People Say I Am, That's What I'm Not, the album is considered more ambitious, with ambient sounds and expanded drum rhythms being introduced. Like Arctic Monkey's debut, Favourite Worst Nightmare was a widespread critical success, with critics highlighting the band's new emotional depth and Alex Turner's matured songwriting. NME and Uncut ranked it the second-best album of 2007, while Dutch publication OOR named it the best of 2007. In retrospect, the album is considered the start of the band's change of sound with each of their albums after their debut.

In its first week of release, the album sold over 227,000 copies, going straight to number one on the UK Albums Chart. "Brianstorm" and "Fluorescent Adolescent" were also both hits on the UK Singles Chart, with the former reaching number two on the chart. In the United States, the album debuted at number seven on the Billboard 200, selling around 44,000 copies in its first week. The album has since gone 4× platinum in the UK. It was nominated for the 2007 Mercury Prize and won Best British Album at the 2008 BRIT Awards.

Title and cover art
The album's title came from the lyrics to the song "D is for Dangerous", the third song featured on the album. The band said they also considered naming the album Lesbian Wednesdays, Gordon Brown, or Gary Barlow. In an interview with NME, Nick O'Malley announced several songs including "D is for Dangerous" and "Balaclava". The tracks "The Bakery" and "Plastic Tramp" also mentioned in the NME interview did not make it onto the album, but were later released as B-sides on the "Fluorescent Adolescent" single. The track "Leave Before the Lights Come On" was also rumoured for inclusion, but did not make the final cut.

Half of the album's songs were debuted at concerts before the release of the album. The album was recorded quickly as the band wanted to start touring and play the songs.

The album's cover art features a black-and-white photograph of a house in the Garston district of Liverpool, with colourful cartoonish images visible through its windows. This marks the second consecutive time the band used a photograph taken in Liverpool as an album cover, following their debut album Whatever People Say I Am, That's What I'm Not.

Musical style
The music on Favourite Worst Nightmare has been characterised as post-punk revival, indie rock, and garage rock, and post-Britpop. In comparison to the band's debut album Whatever People Say I Am, That's What I'm Not, the album has been described as "very, very fast and very, very loud", being seen as "more ambitious, heavier...and with a fiercely bright production". Reflecting the band's travels around the world more than the local stories of the first record, Favourite Worst Nightmare is a "faster, meaner" album. The album arguably has influences from The Smiths – "twanging, quasi-ambient backdrops...and Turner's voice [...] crooning like Morrissey or Richard Hawley." Matt Helders said "James was DJing loads in the evening so we'd go out and [...] have a dance." As a result, the drum rhythms of Helders and bassist Nick O'Malley have drawn comparisons to the Eighties funk band ESG. The band's love of classic films also influenced their new style. For example, the organ at the beginning of the album's final track, "505" replicates Ennio Morricone's soundtrack for The Good, the Bad and the Ugly (where Angel Eyes enters before the final standoff).

Critical reception

Like with the band’s debut album, Favourite Worst Nightmare has received universal acclaim since its release. It has a score of 82 on Metacritic, which assigns a normalised rating out of 100, based on 38 reviews.

In a 5-star review, The Daily Express described it as "a shockingly good release that just gets better, faster and stronger with each listen", while The Guardian said it had "successfully negotiated the daunting task of following up the biggest-selling debut album in British history" and stated that the second half of the album was the stronger half, noting the similarity to Morrissey in "Fluorescent Adolescent" whilst criticising the opening tracks, "Brianstorm" in particular. Their progression was also highlighted with The Guardian saying "if you removed everything from the album except Matt Helders' drumming, it would still be a pretty gripping listen", and The Observer praising the new sounds on the album referencing the "piercing, melodic guitar by Jamie Cook" and "where Turner reveals the other weapons in his armoury" when referring to Alex Turner's progression. Pitchfork Media noticed the "new emotional depth" of tracks such as "Do Me a Favour", "Only Ones Who Know" and "505", which were also commonly cited by most other critics as being amongst the highlights. NME and Uncut ranked it as the second-best album of 2007. Dutch publication OOR named it the best of 2007.

Jacob Stolworthy of The Independent reviewed the album on its 10th anniversary in 2017, saying, "Favourite Worst Nightmare was the first sign that Arctic Monkeys would change up their sound with each new record in as drastic a fashion as they wished [...] If their debut defined a generation, this record shaped the band's future in a manner more mature, sexy and - just like the party depicted in the rowdy track 'This House Is a Circus' - berserk as f*ck."

Commercial performance
In its first week of release, Favourite Worst Nightmare sold 227,993 copies, emulating Whatever People Say I Am, That's What I'm Not in going straight to number one on the UK Albums Chart, albeit selling 130,000 copies fewer than the band's record-breaking debut. The first two singles from the album, "Brianstorm" and "Fluorescent Adolescent", were both UK top-10 hits. The album's first day sales of 85,000 outsold the rest of the top 20 combined, while all 12 tracks from the album entered the top 200 of the UK Singles Chart. By September 2022, 1,200,000 copies of the album had been sold in the UK; it was certified 4× Platinum in 2022. The album was nominated for the Mercury Prize in 2007 and won Best British Album at the BRIT Awards the following year.

In the United States, the album debuted at number 7 on the Billboard 200, selling around 44,000 copies in its first week and become the band's first top-10 album there. The album also achieved top-10 debuts in 12 other countries, including Australia, Canada, Ireland, France, Japan, Mexico, and New Zealand.

Track listing

Bonus video
 The music video for "Brianstorm" was included as a bonus with iTunes pre-orders of Favourite Worst Nightmare.

Personnel
Credits adapted from liner notes.

Arctic Monkeys
 Alex Turner – lead vocals; guitar (1–11), keyboards (12)
 Jamie Cook – guitar (1–5, 7–12); backing vocals (1)
 Matt Helders – drums (1–5, 7–12), backing vocals (1–5, 8, 10–11)
 Nick O'Malley – bass guitar; backing vocals (1, 3–5, 8, 10)

Additional musicians
 James Ford – guitar 
 Miles Kane – guitar 

Production
 James Ford – production, mixing 
 Mike Crossey – production, mixing 
 Alan Moulder – mixing 
 George Marino – mastering

Artwork
 Juno – art direction and design, illustrations, booklet photography
 Matthew Cooper – layout
 Joseph Bramhall – illustrations
 Graphique Club – illustrations
 Drew Millward – illustrations
 Al Heighton – illustrations
 Anne-Marie Moore – illustrations
 Tobias – illustrations
 de5ign4 – spray can murals
 Matt Goodfellow – photography

Charts

Weekly charts

Year-end charts

Decade-end charts

Certifications

Release history

References

External links

2007 albums
Albums produced by James Ford (musician)
Arctic Monkeys albums
Domino Recording Company albums
Warner Records albums
Brit Award for British Album of the Year